Glutaminyl-tRNA synthase (glutamine-hydrolyzing)-like 1 is a protein that in humans is encoded by the QRSL1 gene.

References

Further reading